Bull Street tram stop is a tram stop on the West Midlands Metro tram system serving Bull Street in the Birmingham city centre, England. Construction started in June 2012, and it was opened on 6 December 2015, becoming the first stop of the city-centre extension to open, and the first on-street tram stop to operate in Birmingham since the closure of the Birmingham Corporation Tramways in 1953, and the temporary southern terminus of the service. The rest of the extension to Grand Central was opened on 30 May 2016,
 and then onto Edgbaston Village in July 2022. Work started on a new line to Birmingham Moor Street in 2022 which will be gradually extended to the eventual terminus at Birmingham Airport. To allow for the new connection to be made it became necessary to temporarily terminate all trams at Bull Street.

Services
Mondays to Saturdays, West Midlands Metro services in each direction between Edgbaston and Wolverhampton St George's run at six to eight-minute intervals during the day, and at fifteen-minute intervals during the evenings and on Sundays.

References

Transport in Birmingham, West Midlands
Transport infrastructure completed in 2015
West Midlands Metro stops